Kazys Petkevičius (January 1, 1926 – October 14, 2008) was a Lithuanian basketball player who competed for the Soviet Union in the 1952 Summer Olympics and in the 1956 Summer Olympics. He played for Žalgiris in Kaunas and later for Spartak Leningrad in Leningrad.

Petkevičius graduated from the State Institute of Physical Education (now Lithuanian Sports University) in 1949 and continued his post-graduate studies in Leningrad.

Until the end of his life he worked as an assistant coach for the Lithuanian basketball club Žalgiris-Arvydas Sabonis school.

References

External links
 
 

1926 births
2008 deaths
People from Pakruojis District Municipality
Basketball players at the 1952 Summer Olympics
Basketball players at the 1956 Summer Olympics
Burevestnik (sports society) athletes
BC Žalgiris coaches
BC Žalgiris players
Lithuanian basketball coaches
Lithuanian men's basketball players
Medalists at the 1952 Summer Olympics
Medalists at the 1956 Summer Olympics
Olympic basketball players of the Soviet Union
Olympic medalists in basketball
Olympic silver medalists for the Soviet Union
Soviet basketball coaches
Soviet men's basketball players
Honoured Masters of Sport of the USSR